Kamil Drygas (born 7 September 1991 in Kępno) is a Polish professional footballer who plays as a defensive midfielder for Miedź Legnica.

Club career
Drygas began his career in Marcinki Kępno. Until 2007 he played in Amica Wronki.

In 2007, he signed for Lech Poznań. In 2008, he joined to Młoda Ekstraklasa team. In 2010, he was promoted to the senior team. Drygas made his debut in the 0–1 UEFA Champions League qualifications defeat against Sparta Prague on 27 June 2010.

He was then loaned out to Zawisza Bydgoszcz, whom he joined permanently in 2013. In January 2016, he signed a contract with Pogoń Szczecin, which means he joined Pogoń after his contract with Zawisza expired in June 2016.

On 25 January 2023, Drygas moved to Miedź Legnica on a three-and-a-half-year contract, becoming Miedź's record signing.

International career
In August 2010, Drygas was selected to Poland U20 team. On 3 September 2010 he played 45 minutes in a friendly match against Uzbekistan.

Club career statistics

1 Including Polish Super Cup.

International career statistic

Honours

Zawisza Bydgoszcz
I liga: 2012–13
Polish Cup: 2013–14
Polish Super Cup: 2014

References

External links
 
 

1991 births
Living people
Footballers from Poznań
Polish footballers
Association football midfielders
Amica Wronki players
Lech Poznań players
Zawisza Bydgoszcz players
Pogoń Szczecin players
Miedź Legnica players
Ekstraklasa players
I liga players
III liga players
People from Kępno County
Poland youth international footballers
Poland under-21 international footballers